Walter Henry "Jack" Beal Jr. (June 25, 1931 – August 29, 2013) was an American realist painter.

Biography 
Jack Beal was born in Richmond, Virginia in 1931. He studied at the Norfolk Division of the College of William and Mary and then at the School of the Art Institute of Chicago, where he was a student of Kathleen Blackshear. At the Art Institute of Chicago, he met artist Sondra Freckelton (1936-2019), who he married in 1955. In 1957, Beal and Freckleton moved to New York City and then in the 1970s to a farm in Oneonta, New York. He died in Oneonta in August 2013 at the age of 82. 

Beal achieved recognition in New York City and elsewhere during the 1960s. His realist paintings were seen in solo exhibitions at the Allen Frumkin Galleries in New York City and Chicago, and dozens of other galleries in New York, Boston, Miami, Paris and elsewhere. His paintings have been included in important exhibitions at The Whitney Museum of American Art and the Virginia Museum of Fine Arts, among other fine art institutions. In 1976, Beal was elected into the National Academy of Design as an Associate member, and became a full member in 1983. In the 1990s, Beal taught at the New York Academy of Art and Hollins College.

Realism 
Beal's early work after leaving the Art Institute of Chicago was strongly influenced by Abstract Expressionism, especially the work of Arshile Gorky, but he quickly grew disillusioned with the movement. Beal was one of several New York-based painters of the 1960s, including Philip Pearlstein and Alfred Leslie, who rejected Abstract Expressionism and embraced an approach to figurative art that has been termed "New Realism." Beal "mined a rich vein of representation, which has usually demonstrated a fine sense of observation, an inventive painterliness, an acute responsiveness to shape and pattern, the ability to create dynamic compositional structures, and always the willingness to take artistic risks rather than languish in a single mode of picture making." The variety of Beal's works included nudes, still-lifes, portraits, landscapes, and allegorical compositions.

Public Art 

In addition to oil paintings, drawings, etchings, and lithographs, Beal also undertook major works of public art.

The History of Labor in America 
The US General Service Administration commissioned Beal to create four murals, The History of Labor in America, which he painted between 1974 and 1977 for the new headquarters of the United States Department of Labor in Washington, D.C. It was one of the first such commissions by the federal government since the WPA Federal Art Project (1935-1943). With their optimistic portrayal of the history of labor in the United States and the theme of the dignity of work, Hilton Kramer declared that "Jack Beal established himself as the most important Social Realist to have emerged in American painting since the 1930s."

The Return of Spring and The Onset of Winter 
In 1986, the MTA commissioned Beal to produce a mosaic mural for the Times Square-42nd Street Subway Station titled The Return of Spring (2001). After the positive response to the first mural, the MTA commissioned a second mural facing it, The Onset of Winter (2005). They present the classical myth of Persephone set against the backdrop of the New York City Subway.

Public collections
The Art Institute of Chicago, Chicago, Illinois
Delaware Art Museum, Wilmington, Delaware
Hirshhorn Museum and Sculpture Garden, Washington, DC
Kalamazoo Institute of Arts, Kalamazoo, MI
Museum of Modern Art, New York
National Gallery of Art, Washington, DC
National Museum of American Art, Washington, DC
Neuberger Museum of Art, State University of New York, Purchase
Philadelphia Museum of Art, Philadelphia, Pennsylvania
The John and Mable Ringling Museum of Art, Sarasota, Florida
San Francisco Museum of Modern Art, San Francisco, California
Smith College Museum of Art, Northampton, Massachusetts
Toledo Art Museum, Toledo, Ohio
Valparaiso University, Valparaiso, Indiana
Virginia Museum of Fine Arts, Richmond, Virginia
Walker Art Center, Minneapolis, Minnesota
Whitney Museum of American Art, New York City

References

External links
Artist's website
Jack Beal obituary
Artist's bio
askart bio
 Remembering Jack Beal

1931 births
People from Otsego County, New York
American realist painters
20th-century American painters
American male painters
21st-century American painters
21st-century American male artists
School of the Art Institute of Chicago alumni
Artists from Richmond, Virginia
2013 deaths
Painters from Virginia
Painters from New York (state)
20th-century American male artists